Events in the year 1602 in Norway.

Incumbents
Monarch: Christian IV

Events
 Hamar Cathedral School merged with Oslo Cathedral School.

Arts and literature
Prestepina, a quiz book, is published for the first time. The book was a translation from German by Hallvard Gunnarssøn, and was later reissued numerous times, the last time in 1870.

Deaths

8 April - Ludvig Munk, Stadtholder of Norway (b.1537)

See also

References